Hasanabad (also Romanized as Ḩasanābād) is a village in Torkaman Rural District, in the Central District of Urmia County, West Azerbaijan Province, Iran. At the 2006 census, its population was 212, in 54 families.

References 

Populated places in Urmia County